Ahmad bin Ibrahim (17 May 1927 – 21 August 1962) was a Singaporean politician who served as Minister of Health between 1959 and 1961, and Minister for Labour from 1961 until his death in 1962, in the First Cabinet of Singapore. An active unionist, Ahmad was first elected as the Member of the Legislative Assembly for Sembawang as an independent candidate in the 1955 general election.

Biography
Born in Penang, Ahmad attended Penang Free School. 

Ahmad contested in Sembawang as an independent candidate during the 1955 general election and won. 

A former First Branch Secretary of the All-Singapore Fire Brigade Employees Union and Vice-President of the Naval Base Labour Union, Ahmad was co-opted into the People's Action Party's Central Executive Committee in 1956. During the 1959 general election, he was re-elected as a Member of the Legislative Assembly as a PAP candidate. 

When the PAP government formed its first Cabinet that year, Ahmad served as Minister for Health. He was also appointed Assistant Secretary-General of the party's CEC. After a Cabinet reshuffle in September 1961, Ahmad was appointed Minister for Labour. 

Ahmad died on 21 August 1962, at the age of 35, at Singapore General Hospital after a prolonged illness while holding the portfolio of Minister for Labour. He was accorded a state funeral and buried at Bidadari Cemetery.

Legacy
Jalan Ahmad Ibrahim—a road in Boon Lay, Ahmad Ibrahim Primary School, Ahmad Ibrahim Secondary School and Masjid Ahmad Ibrahim in Yishun are named after him.

References 

1927 births
1962 deaths
People from Penang
Members of the Cabinet of Singapore
Members of the Parliament of Singapore
People's Action Party politicians
Singaporean people of Malay descent
Singaporean Muslims
Singaporean people of Malaysian descent
Ministers for Health of Singapore
Ministers for Labour of Singapore
Members of the Legislative Assembly of Singapore